Our Lady of Lourdes Roman Catholic Primary School (commonly abbreviated to OLOL) is a primary school in The Limes Avenue, near Bowes Road, in Arnos Grove in the London Borough of Enfield. The school opened in 1971. An ICT suite was built at the school in 2001, and the school won achievement awards from the DfES in 2001, 2002 and 2003. The school has recently had a rapid increase in the number of after school clubs offered, although it remains a single form entry school. It is also, strangely but incorrectly, well known in most of Enfield for having no corridors.

Houses
The school's houses are named after important places in the life of Jesus. Each house has its own colour:
 Bethany - Red
 Cana - Blue
 Emmaus - Green
 Galilee - Yellow

Performance
Pupils at Our Lady of Lourdes generally achieve high results in their KS2 tests and the school ranks among the top schools in the London Borough of Enfield.
2003 aggregate score
2004 aggregate score
2005 aggregate score
2006 aggregate score
2007 aggregate score

References

External links
 Our Lady of Lourdes School website

Primary schools in the London Borough of Enfield
Catholic primary schools in the Archdiocese of Westminster
Educational institutions established in 1971
Voluntary aided schools in London
1971 establishments in England
Arnos Grove